The men's ISSF 50 meter pistol event at the 2016 Olympic Games took place on 10 August 2016 at the National Shooting Center. There were 41 competitors from 29 nations. The event was won by Jin Jong-oh of South Korea, his third consecutive victory in the free pistol. He was the only man to win two gold medals in the event, much less three. Jin was also the second man to win four medals of any color in the event, after Ragnar Skanåker of Sweden from 1972 to 1992. Hoàng Xuân Vinh took silver, the first medal for Vietnam in the event. Kim Song-guk's bronze was North Korea's first medal in the free pistol since 2004 (the nation had a silver medal stripped in 2008 due to doping).

Background

This was the 24th—and final—appearance of the ISSF 50 meter pistol event. The event was held at every Summer Olympics from 1896 to 1920 (except 1904, when no shooting events were held) and from 1936 to 2016; it was open to women from 1968 to 1980. 1896 and 1908 were the only Games in which the distance was not 50 metres; the former used 30 metres and the latter 50 yards. The event, which had no women's equivalent, was dropped after 2016 to make room for a mixed team air pistol event as the sport moved toward gender equality.

Four of the eight finalists from the 2012 Games returned: two-time gold medalist (and 2004 silver medalist) Jin Jong-oh of South Korea, bronze medalist Wang Zhiwei of China, fourth-place finisher Hoàng Xuân Vinh of Vietnam, and fifth-place finisher Giuseppe Giordano of Italy. The 2014 world championship podium had been Jin Jong-oh, Jitu Rai of India, and Pang Wei of Wei; all three competed in Rio de Janeiro.

Georgia, Myanmar, and Panama each made their debut in the event. The United States made its 22nd appearance, most of any nation, having missed only the 1900 event and the boycotted 1980 Games.

Jin used a Morini CM84E.

Qualification

Each National Olympic Committee (NOC) could enter up to two shooters if the NOC earned enough quota sports or had enough crossover-qualified shooters. To compete, a shooter needed a quota spot and to achieve a Minimum Qualification Score (MQS). Once a shooter was using a quota spot in any shooting event, they could enter any other shooting event for which they had achieved the MQS as well (a crossover qualification). There were 22 quota spots available for the free pistol: 4 at the 2014 World Championship, 8 at the 2015 World Cup events (2 spots at each of 4 events), 9 for continental events (3 for Europe, 2 each for Asia and Americas, and 1 each for Africa and Oceania), and a Tripartite Commission invitation. One place was added through the exchange system. There were 19 double-starters from other events, primarily the 10 metre air pistol event.

Competition format

The competition featured two rounds, qualifying and final. The 2016 competition introduced fundamental changes to the final format.

The qualifying round was the same as the previous competitions: each shooter fired 60 shots, in 6 series of 10 shots each, at a distance of 50 metres. The target was round, 50 centimetres in diameter, with 10 scoring rings. Scoring for each shot was up to 10 points, in increments of 1 point. The maximum score possible was 600 points. The top 8 shooters advanced to a final.

In prior Games, the final had been an additional series of 10 shots, with the score added to their qualifying round score to give a 70-shot total. For 2016, the final instead wiped the qualifying scores and started anew. The shooters would each fire up to 20 shots in the final. However, beginning after the 8th shot and continuing every 2 shots thereafter, the shooter with the lowest total in the final was eliminated. Thus, all 8 shooters fired 8 shots, 7 shooters fired 10 shots, 6 shooters fired 8 shots, and so on until only 2 shooters fired the 19th and 20th shots. Decimal scoring applied in the final; shots could score up to 10.9. The total maximum was therefore 818.0. Any pistol was permitted.

Records

Prior to this competition, the existing world and Olympic records were as follows.

Jin Jong-oh set the new format's initial Olympic record at 193.7; with the event discontinued, that record will never be beaten.

Schedule

Results

Qualifying

Final

After the first 8 shots, Kim led a fairly narrowly-grouped top seven, with Pang well behind resulting in his elimination. The ninth shot was disastrous for two-time defending champion Jin, as the 6.6 dropped him to last place. He was able to recover in shot 10, however, and Kopp's 7.1 was enough to eliminate the Slovakian while Jin narrowly survived by 0.7 points. Meanwhile, Hoàng Xuân Vinh took the lead halfway through. He and Kim continued to shoot well in the next pair, creating a 4.5 and 4.4 point lead over Jin, who had moved up to third place with a pair of 10+ shots. Han created some separation at the bottom from Wang and Gontcharov, the latter of whom was eliminated at 0.2 back of the former.

The 13th and 14th shots went very well for Jin, decently for Hoàng Xuân Vinh, and less well for Kim. The Vietnamese shooter opened a 1.5 point lead over the North Korean, but the South Korean inched a point closer to 3.5 points behind the leader (and 2 points behind Kim for second). Wang was unable to close ground on Han, and was eliminated. Shots 15 and 16 for the remaining four shooters saw 5 of 8 in the 10-ring; Kim had two of the three 9s, however, and finished the pair tied with Jin in second. They were now 2.3 points behind Hoàng Xuân Vinh (who had the other 9) as Jin closed ground. Han was well behind the lead group and eliminated in this round, solidifying the medalists.

In the final elimination pair of shots, Jin again hit a pair of 10s; the other two shooters combined for four 9s. Hoàng Xuân Vinh still held the lead, but it was down to 0.2 points now. Kim fell to third place for the first time, just as that position was the elimination place. With only the two shooters left and a very close match, Jin shot 19.3 in the final pair to win, as Hoàng Xuân Vinh only achieved 16.7 (well below needed to preserve his narrow lead).

References

External links
 Rio de Janeiro 2016 Official Homepage - 50m Pistol Men Results 

Shooting at the 2016 Summer Olympics
Men's 2016
Men's events at the 2016 Summer Olympics